The Emperor Returns is a board game published in 1986 by Clash of Arms.

Contents
The Emperor Returns is a game in which moving and fighting an army of the Napoleonic era is portrayed, including supply and attrition, army morale, leadership, intelligence and administration.

Reception
Mike Siggins reviewed The Emperor Returns for Games International magazine, and gave it 2 stars out of 5, and stated that "On balance I cannot recommend this game to the people most likely to buy it; that is, enthusiastic Napoleonic gamers. Much of what the system offers is clever, deceptively atmospheric and it comes closer than many to its goal, but for those of you who want a true simulation the field is still wide open."

References

Board games introduced in 1986
Clash of Arms games